Naqsh-e Jahan Square ( Maidān-e Naghsh-e Jahān; trans: "Image of the World Square"), also known as the Shah Square (میدان شاه) prior to 1979,  is a square situated at the center of Isfahan, Iran. Constructed between 1598 and 1629, it is now an important historical site, and one of UNESCO's World Heritage Sites. It is also referred to as Shah Square or Imam Square.
The square is surrounded by buildings from the Safavid era.
The Shah Mosque is situated on the south side of this square. On the west side is the Ali Qapu Palace. Sheikh Lotf Allah Mosque is situated on the eastern side of this square and at the northern side Qeysarie Gate opens into the Isfahan Grand Bazaar.
Today, Namaaz-e Jom'eh (the Muslim Friday prayer) is held in the Shah Mosque.

The square is depicted on the reverse of the Iranian 20,000 rials banknote.
Stores are owned by trust of  Ostandari Isfahan.

History 

In 1598, when Shah Abbas decided to move the capital of his empire from the north-western city of Qazvin to the central city of Isfahan, he initiated what would become one of the greatest programmes in Persian history; the complete remaking of the city. By choosing the central city of Isfahan, with the Zāyande roud ("The life-giving river"), lying as an oasis of intense cultivation in the midst of a vast area of arid landscape, he distanced his capital from any future assaults by the Ottomans, the arch rival of the Safavids, and the Uzbeks, and at the same time gained more control over the Persian Gulf, which had recently become an important trading route for the Dutch and British East India Companies.

The chief architect of this colossal task of urban planning was Shaykh Bahai (Baha' ad-Din al-`Amili), who focused the programme on two key features of Shah Abbas's master plan: the Chahar Bagh avenue, flanked at either side by all the prominent institutions of the city, such as the residences of all foreign dignitaries, and the Naqsh-e Jahan Square ("Exemplar of the World"). Prior to the Shah's ascent to power, Persia had a decentralized power-structure, in which different institutions battled for power, including both the military (the Qizilbash) and governors of the different provinces making up the empire. Shah Abbas wanted to undermine this political structure, and the recreation of Isfahan, as a Grand capital of Persia, was an important step in centralizing the power. The ingenuity of the square, or Maidān, was that, by building it, Shah Abbas would gather the three main components of power in Persia in his own backyard; the power of the clergy, represented by the Masjed-e Shah, the power of the merchants, represented by the Imperial Bazaar, and of course, the power of the Shah himself, residing in the Ali Qapu Palace.

Maidan – The Royal Square 
The Maidan was where the Shah and the people met. Built as a two-story row of shops, flanked by impressive architecture, and eventually leading up to the northern end, where the Imperial Bazaar was situated, the square was a busy arena of entertainment and business, exchanged between people from all corners of the world. As Isfahan was a vital stop along the Silk Road, goods from many countries of the world, spanning from Portugal in the West, to the Middle Kingdom in the East, found its ways to the hands of gifted merchants, who knew how to make the best profits out of them.

The Royal Square was also admired by Europeans who visited Isfahan during Shah Abbas' reign. Pietro Della Valle conceded that it outshone the Piazza Navona in his native Rome.

During the day, much of the square was occupied by the tents and stalls of tradesmen, who paid a weekly rental to the government. There were also entertainers and actors. For the hungry, there were readily available cooked foods or slices of melon, while cups of water were handed out for free by water-carriers paid for by the shop-keepers. At the entrance to the Imperial Bazaar, there were coffee-houses, where people could relax over a cup of fresh coffee and a water-pipe. These shops can still be found today, although the drink in fashion for the past century has been tea, rather than coffee. At dusk, the shop-keepers packed up, and the huzz and buzz of tradesmen and eager shoppers bargaining over the prices of goods would be given over to dervishes, mummers, jugglers, puppet-players, acrobats and prostitutes.

Every now and then the square would be cleared off for public ceremonies and festivities. One such occasion would be the annual event of Nowruz, the Persian New Year. Also, the national Persian sport of polo could be played in the maidan, providing the Shah, residing in the Ali Qapu palace, and the busy shoppers with some entertainment. The marble goal-posts, erected by Shah Abbas, still stand at either end of the Maydan.

Under Abbas, Isfahan became a very cosmopolitan city, with a resident population of Turks, Georgians, Armenians, Indians, Chinese and a growing number of Europeans. Shah Abbas brought in some 300 Chinese artisans to work in the royal workshops and to teach the art of porcelain-making. The Indians were present in very large numbers, housed in the many caravanserais that were dedicated to them, and they mainly worked as merchants and money-changers. The Europeans were there as merchants, Roman Catholic missionaries, artists and craftsmen. Even soldiers, usually with expertise in artillery, would make the journey from Europe to Persia to make a living. The Portuguese ambassador, De Gouvea, once stated that:

Also, many historians have wondered about the peculiar orientation of the maidān. Unlike most buildings of importance, this square did not lie in alignment with Mecca, so that when entering the entrance-portal of the Shah Mosque, one makes, almost without realising it, the half-right turn which enables the main court within to face Mecca.Donald Wilber gives the most plausible explanation to this; the vision of Shaykh Bahai was for the mosque to be visible wherever in the maydān a person was situated. Had the axis of the maydān coincided with the axis of Mecca, the dome of the mosque would have been concealed from view by the towering entrance-portal leading to it. By creating an angle between them, the two parts of the building, the entrance-portal and the dome, are in perfect view for everyone within the square to admire.

Masjed-e Shah – The Pinnacle of Safavid Architecture 

The Crown Jewel in the Naghs-e Jahan Square was the Masjed-e Shah, which would replace the much older Jameh Mosque in conducting the Friday prayers. To achieve this, the Shah Mosque was constructed not only with vision of grandeur, having the largest dome in the city, but Shaykh Bahai also planned the construction of a religious school and a winter-mosque clamped at either side of it.

The Lotfollah Mosque 

Of the four monuments that dominated the perimeter of the Naqsh-e Jahan square, the Lotfollah Mosque, opposite the palace, was the first to be built. The purpose of this mosque was for it to be a private mosque of the royal court, unlike the Masjed-e Shah, which was meant for the public. For this reason, the mosque does not have any minarets and is of a smaller size. Indeed, few Westerners at the time of the Safavids even paid any attention to this mosque, and they certainly did not have access to it. It wasn't until centuries later, when the doors were opened to the public, that ordinary people could admire the effort that Shah Abbas had put into making this a sacred place for the ladies of his harem, and the exquisite tile-work, which is far superior to those covering the Shah Mosque.

Ali Qapu Palace 

Ali Qapu (pronounced, ah-lee gah-pooh) is in effect but a pavilion that marks the entrance to the vast royal residential quarter of the Safavid Isfahan which stretched from the Maidan Naqsh-e Jahan to the Chahar Bagh Boulevard. The name is made of two elements: "Ali", Arabic for exalted, and "Qapu" Turkic for portal or royal threshold. The compound stands for "Exalted Porte". This name was chosen by the Safavids to rival the Ottomans' celebrated name for their court : Bab-i Ali, or the "Sublime Porte").
It was here that the great monarch used to entertain noble visitors, and foreign ambassadors.

On the sixth floor, the royal reception and banquets were held. The largest rooms are found on this floor. The stucco decoration of the banquet hall abounds in motif of various vessels and cups. The sixth floor was popularly called (the music room) as it was here that various ensembles performed music and sang songs. From the upper galleries, the Safavid ruler watched polo games, maneuvers and horse-racing below in the Naqsh-e Jahan square.

The Imperial Bazaar 

The Bazaar of Isfahan is a historical market and one of the oldest and largest bazaars of the Middle East. Although the present structure dates back to the Safavid era, parts of it are more than a thousand years old, dating back to the Seljuq dynasty. It is a vaulted, two kilometer street linking the old city with the new.

See also
 Ganjali Khan Complex
 Iranian architecture
 List of city squares by size
 Naqsh e jahan derby
 Safavid architecture
 UNESCO World Heritage Sites

References

Sources
 E. Galdieri and R. Orazi: Progetto di sistemazione del Maydan-i Šāh (Rome, 1969)
 E. Galdieri: ‘Two Building Phases of the Time of Šāh ‛Abbas I in the Maydān-i Šāh of Isfahan: Preliminary Note’, E. & W., n. s., xx (1970), pp. 60–69
 H. Luschey: ‘Der königliche Marstall in Iṣfahān und Engelbert Kaempfers Planographia des Palastbezirkes 1712’, Iran, xvii (1979), pp. 71–9
 E. Galdieri: ‘Esfahan e la Domus Spectaculi Automatorum’, Proceedings of the First European Conference of Iranian Studies, Societas Iranologica Europaea: Turin, 1987, ii, pp. 377–88
 A. Jabalameli: ‘Meidan Eman en Isfahán’, Patrimonio Mundial, xix (2000), pp. 20–31

External links

Naqsh-e Jahan Square in Google Maps
 The Mosque Sheikh Lotfollah  A Documentary film directed by Manouchehr Tayyab (15 min)
 Emam Square page at Cultural Heritage Organization of Iran (in Persian)
 Naqsh-e Jahan Square Video Documentary of Naqsh-e Jahan Square and Surrounding Buildings, by Aslı Pınar Tan (41:45 mins)
See the 360 degrees VR panorama
More Pictures, Tishineh
360 degree view of the Masjid-e Shah and the Naqsh-e Jahan Square, at night

Buildings and structures completed in 1629
Buildings and structures in Isfahan
World Heritage Sites in Iran
Squares in Iran
Islamic architecture
Architecture in Iran
Safavid architecture
Tourist attractions in Isfahan
1629 establishments in Iran